Lampinen is a Finnish surname. As of 2013, there were almost 10,000 people registered in Finland with this surname. It is a derivation of the Finnish word "lampi", that also occurs as surname in Finland, and it means one who lives by a pond. As a surname it appears both as an old, traditional surname in Eastern Finland and as a new, recently adopted surname in Western Finland. Notable people with the surname include:

 Mari Lampinen (born 1971), Finnish biathlete
 Petteri Lampinen, Finnish bandy player 
 Simo Lampinen, Finnish rally driver

See also
 Lampi (surname)

References

Finnish-language surnames